Menchalville is an unincorporated community located in the town of Franklin, Manitowoc County, Wisconsin.

References

Unincorporated communities in Manitowoc County, Wisconsin
Unincorporated communities in Wisconsin